The Tomb of Khajeh Rabie dates back to the Safavid dynasty and is located in Mashhad, at the end of Khajeh Rabie Street.

Gallery

References 

Buildings and structures in Mashhad
Mausoleums in Iran
Tourist attractions in Razavi Khorasan Province